Calamodontophis paucidens, the tropical forest snake, is a species of snakes in the family Colubridae. The species is endemic to South America.

Geographic range
C. paucidens is found in Brazil and Uruguay.

Habitat
The natural habitat of C. paucidens is subtropical or tropical dry lowland grassland.

Conservation status
C. paucidens is threatened by habitat loss.

References

Further reading
Amaral A ("1935" [1936]). "Contribução ao conhecimento dos ofídios do Brasil. VII. Novos gêneros e espécies de Colubrideos opisthoglyphos ". Mémorias do Instituto Butantan 9: 203–207. (Calamodon paucidens, new species, p. 204). (in Portuguese).
Freiberg M (1982). Snakes of South America. Hong Kong: T.F.H. Publications. 189 pp. . (Calamodontophis paucidens, p. 92).

Calamodontophis
Reptiles described in 1936
Taxonomy articles created by Polbot
Reptiles of Uruguay
Reptiles of Brazil